The following is a list of events affecting Philippine television in 1991. Events listed include television show debuts, finales, cancellations, and channel launches, closures, and rebrandings, as well as information about controversies and carriage disputes.

Events
 May 15 – ABS-CBN launches Maalaala Mo Kaya.
 June 12 - Coverage of the 1991 eruption of Mount Pinatubo is aired on all television stations, ABS-CBN's coverage promotes DOMSAT simulcasts to millions nationwide.
 August 28 - Radio Mindanao Network's first television station went on air DXHB-TV Channel 8 in Cagayan de Oro.
 November 24 – December 8: PTV broadcasts nationwide the live events of the 1991 Southeast Asian Games.

Premieres

Unknown
 Isabel, Sugo ng Birhen on ABS-CBN
 Ready, Get Set, Go! on ABS-CBN
 Business and Leisure on ABS-CBN
 Options on ABS-CBN
 Eh Kasi Bata! on ABS-CBN
 Ikaw ang Humatol on Islands TV-13 (now IBC 13)
 No Nonsense! on Islands TV-13 (now IBC 13)
 Magic Kamison on Islands TV-13 (now IBC 13)
 Four Da Boys on Islands TV-13 (now IBC 13)
 The Jazz Show on Islands TV-13 (now IBC 13)
 Super Games on Islands TV-13 (now IBC 13)
 The Hour of Truth on Islands TV-13 (now IBC 13)
 R.S.V.P. on GMA
 Face to Face on GMA
 Yan si Mommy on GMA
 Concert at the Park on PTV 4
 Hour of Truth with Rev. Apollo C. Quiboloy on Islands TV-13 (now IBC 13)

Programs transferring networks

Finales
May 10: Goin' Bananas on ABS-CBN

Unknown date

Unknown
 Chika Chika Chicks on ABS-CBN
 Discovery Drama Theater on ABS-CBN
 Small Brothers on ABS-CBN
 Tonight with Dick and Carmi on ABS-CBN
 It Bulingit on ABS-CBN
 Bahay Kalinga on ABS-CBN
 Agring-Agri on Islands TV-13 (now IBC 13)
 24 Oras on Islands TV-13 (now IBC 13)
 Ula ang Batang Gubat on Islands TV-13 (now IBC 13)
 Computer Man on Islands TV-13 (now IBC 13)
 Computer Kid on Islands TV-13 (now IBC 13)
 Magic Kamison on Islands TV-13 (now IBC 13)
 Ang Manok Ni San Pedro on Islands TV-13 (now IBC 13)
 Mongolian Barbecue on Islands TV-13 (now IBC 13)
 Chairman and Friends at Faces on Islands TV-13 (now IBC 13)
 The Jazz Show on Islands TV-13 (now IBC 13)
 Super Games on Islands TV-13 (now IBC 13)
 Try God on Islands TV-13 (now IBC 13)
 Cine Pinoy on Islands TV-13 (now IBC 13)
 Concert at the Park on GMA
 The Penthouse Party on GMA
 Pandakekoks on GMA
 Good Morning Showbiz on GMA
 On the Spot on GMA
 Family 3 + 1 on GMA
 Shaider on ABS-CBN

Births
February 21 - Almira Francisco, actress, singer and TV Host
February 27 - Errol Abalayan, actor
March 18 - Rowell Capino, actor, dancer and TV Host
March 21 - Maichel Fideles, actor, dancer and TV Host
May 3 - Bela Padilla, actress
May 15 - Gerald Santos, Filipino actor and singer
May 17 - Elle Ramirez, actress 
May 28 - Beauty Gonzalez, actress and model
June 16 - Ryan Bang, actor and comedian
June 22 - Michael Jim Polancos, comedian
July 1 - Kim Molina, actress
July 19 - Arny Ross, actress
August 13 – Kazel Kinouchi, actress
August 19 - Nathan Lopez, actor
August 26 –
 Wil Dasovich, model and vlogger
 Miguel Estenzo, actor
August 26 - Haley Dasovich, model and vlogger
September 6 - Klarisse de Guzman, singer
September 26 – Angelo Pasco, actor
September 27 - Ynna Asistio, actress
November 25 - Martin del Rosario, actor
December 4 - Phoebe Walker, actress and model

References

See also
1991 in television

 
Television in the Philippines by year
Philippine television-related lists